More than 600 murals depicting American professional basketball player Kobe Bryant have been painted in dozens of countries, including Croatia, Haiti, Uganda, and the United States. Many were created following his death in the 2020 Calabasas helicopter crash.

United States 
A mural in Laredo, Texas, took ten months to complete.

California 
The website KobeMural.com has identified and mapped hundreds of murals in Southern California.

There are many murals of Bryant in Greater Los Angeles, including in Long Beach and Venice. In Downtown Los Angeles, Jonas Never painted a mural on Lebanon Street. The Nelson's Liquor in Burbank has a mural by Isaac Pelayo. The Western Avenue side of the United Auto Center in Jefferson Park has a mural by Danny Mateo. In Melrose, JC Ro painted a mural on the side of a Shoe Palace store. The Burger City Grill in Torrance has a mural by Mike Trujillo. In South Los Angeles' Westmont community, a mural by Manny Sayes appears on the JS Liquor & Market at the intersection of Century Boulevard and Vermont.

There are several murals of Bryant in Orange County, and others in the San Francisco Bay Area.

See also 
 Murals of Los Angeles

References 

Black people in art
Kobe Bryant
Murals
Paintings of people
Sports in art